Sachs/Judah Productions is a film and television production company owned by Gabe Sachs and Jeff Judah. It was formed after the two produced the Postcards from America pilot for HBO.

It was originally set up at Studios USA on July 17, 2001. The company had several pilots like Homeward Bound that didn't get past the pilot stage. It set up network projects on November 11, 2002, with deals at NBC and ABC, most notably for sitcom project commitments. The company moved its offices to Touchstone Television on June 9, 2004, for a two-year production agreement.

Films
Diary of a Wimpy Kid
Diary of a Wimpy Kid: Rodrick Rules

TV series
Life as We Know It
What About Brian (first season only)
90210
The Night Shift

TV pilots
Street Match
Pranks
Jen Y
The Two of Us
Postcards from America
Homeward Bound
In the Game

References

Television production companies of the United States
Film production companies of the United States